Tahu goreng (Indonesian spelling) or Tauhu goreng (Malaysian and Singaporean spelling) is a generic name for any type of fried tofu dish in the cuisines of Indonesia, Malaysia and Singapore.

Preparation

When preparing the dish, cakes of hard tofu are deep fried until golden brown. A popular way to serve fried tofu is to cut them diagonally in half and arranged on a plate garnished with bean sprouts, cucumber and scallion. A thick sauce is prepared with shallots, garlic, chili peppers, shrimp paste, soy sauce and tamarind juice.

Cultural origins
In Malay language and Indonesian; tauhu or tahu refers to 'tofu' and goreng indicates 'fried'. Tofu originated from China and brought to Southeast Asia by Chinese immigrants to the region. Its first arrival in Indonesia is estimated through the Khubilai Khan's army in Kediri at 1292. Fried tofu is consumed extensively in Asian cultures and has found its way into mainstream Western vegetarian diets.

Variations

Indonesia

In Indonesia, tahu goreng can be mildly fried or deep fried, plain or battered. In Indonesia, tahu goreng is usually eaten with sambal kecap a kind of sambal hot condiment made from kecap manis (sweet soy sauce) and chopped chili peppers and shallots. Some variants might use peanut sauce with chili instead. Some variants are:
 Tahu isi: (lit: filled tofu), probably the most popular variant of tahu goreng in Indonesia, tofu filled with bean sprouts, carrots and sometimes minced meat is battered and deep fried. It is commonly found sold by gorengan (Indonesian fritters) vendors. Commonly eaten with cabai rawit (bird's eye chili).
 Tahu sumedang: the name derived from Sumedang city, West Java. Pioneered by Tahu Bunkeng tofu store in Sumedang established by Chinese immigrants in 1917.
 Tahu gejrot: fried tofu in a thin, hot, sweet and sour sauce with shallots and chilies, originated from Cirebon city, West Java.
 Tahu taoge: stir fried diced tofu with beansprouts.
 Tahu campur: (lit: mixed tofu), with beef slices, vegetables, beansprouts, and noodles or rice vermicelli, served in thin broth. The dish is common in East Javan cities, such as Malang, Surabaya, and Lamongan.
 Tahu gunting: (lit: tofu cut with scissor), fried tofu in thick sweet and spicy peanut sauce, originated from Surabaya city, East Java.
 Tahu telur: (lit: tofu with egg), with omelette, beansprout, peanuts, and lontong rice cake, served in thin sweet and sour soy sauce. Also originated from Surabaya city, East Java.
 Tahu bulat (round tofu) or tahu bola also called bola-bola tahu (tofu balls): is a relatively new variant of fried tofu from Tasikmalaya. The tofu is mixed with seasoning and shaped in balls or rounded form, and later deep-fried in cooking oil.
 Kupat tahu: (lit: ketupat with tofu), ketupat rice cake, beansprout, served in thick sweet and spicy peanut sauce, common throughout Java, however the most popular variant came from Kuningan, Magelang, Solo and Surabaya.

See also

 Batagor
 Yong tau foo
 List of tofu dishes
 List of deep fried foods
 Indonesian cuisine
 Malaysian cuisine
 Singaporean cuisine

References

External links
 Indonesian stuffed tofu (tahu isi) recipe from SBS Australia

Tofu dishes
Malaysian cuisine
Singaporean cuisine
Vegetarian dishes of Singapore
Vegetarian dishes of Indonesia
Fried foods
Street food in Indonesia